Kangxi Radicals is a Unicode block. In version 3.0 (1999), this separate Kangxi Radicals block was introduced which encodes the 214 radicals in sequence, at U+2F00–2FD5. These are specific code points intended to represent the radical qua radical, as opposed to the character consisting of the unaugmented radical; thus, U+2F00 represents radical 1 while U+4E00 represents the character yī meaning "one". In addition, the CJK Radicals Supplement block (2E80–2EFF) was introduced, encoding alternative (often positional) forms taken by Kangxi radicals as they appear within specific characters. For example, ⺁ "CJK RADICAL CLIFF" (U+2E81) is a variant of ⼚ radical 27 (U+2F1A), itself identical in shape to the character consisting of unaugmented radical 27, 厂 "cliff" (U+5382).

The Unicode standard encoded 20,992 characters in version 1.0.1 (1992) in the CJK Unified Ideographs block (U+4E00–9FFF). This standard followed the Kangxi order of radicals (radical 1 at U+4E00, radical 214 at U+9FA0) but did not encode all characters found in the Kangxi dictionary. Individual characters were listed based on their Kangxi radical and number of additional strokes, e.g.  U+5382 厂, the unaugmented radical 27 meaning "cliff" is listed under "27.0", while U+5383 to U+5386 are listed under "27.2" as they all consist of radical 27 plus two additional strokes. More characters were added in later versions, adding "CJK Unified Ideographs Extensions" A, B, C, D, E and F as of Unicode 12.1 (2019) with further additions planned for Unicode 13.0. Within each "Extension", characters are also ordered by Kangxi radical and additional strokes. The Unicode Consortium maintains the "Unihan Database", with a  Radical-Stroke-Index. The Unicode Common Locale Data Repository provides no official collation (sort order) rule for Unicode CJK characters (short of sorting characters by code point); such collation rules as there are language-specific (such as JIS X 0208 for Japanese kanji) and do not include any of the CJK Unified Ideographs Extension characters.

Chart

History
The following Unicode-related documents record the purpose and process of defining specific characters in the Kangxi Radicals block:

References

Unicode blocks